The following article is a summary of the 2016–17 football season in Cyprus, which is the 75th season of competitive football in the country and runs from August 2016 to May 2017.

League tables

Cypriot First Division

Regular season

Play-offs

Cypriot Second Division

Cypriot Third Division

STOK Elite Division

National team

2018 FIFA World Cup qualifiers

References

 
Seasons in Cypriot football